Andrij Savka (alternatively Andrew Sawka; 13 December 1619 – 1661), was a Lemko region bandit/"Robin Hood" and folk hero from Dukla.  He was born in 1619 in Stebník.  In 1651, he led 500 men as part of a peasant revolt known as the Kostka-Napierski Uprising.  He was the son of a church cantor, and had some education.

Biography

References

1619 births
1661 deaths
People from Bardejov District
Lemkos
Outlaws
Peasant revolts
People executed by Poland by hanging
Executed Slovak people